The 1989 Colgate Red Raiders football team was an American football team that represented Colgate University during the 1989 NCAA Division I-AA football season. Colgate tied for last in the Colonial League.

In its second season under head coach Michael Foley, the team compiled a 4–7 record. Paul Bushey and Steve Aldiero were the team captains. 

The Red Raiders were outscored 289 to 262. Colgate's 1–3 conference record tied for fourth place in the five-team Colonial League standings.

The team played its home games at Andy Kerr Stadium in Hamilton, New York.

Schedule

References

Colgate
Colgate Raiders football seasons
Colgate Red Raiders football